Crinodes biedermani is a species of moth in the family Notodontidae (the prominents). It was first described by Skinner in 1905 and it is found in North America.

The MONA or Hodges number for Crinodes biedermani is 8028.

References

Further reading

 
 
 

Notodontidae
Articles created by Qbugbot
Moths described in 1905